Chaos Reef  is the confused area of breakers and shoal water in the north extremity of Aitcho Islands group on the west side of English Strait in the South Shetland Islands, Antarctica. The area was visited by early 19th century sealers operating from nearby Clothier Harbour.

Following a survey by the 1949 Chilean Antarctic Expedition, the feature was resurveyed and descriptively named from HMS Protector in 1967.

Location

See also 
 Composite Antarctic Gazetteer
 List of Antarctic and sub-Antarctic islands
 List of Antarctic islands south of 60° S
 SCAR
 Territorial claims in Antarctica

Maps
 L.L. Ivanov. Antarctica: Livingston Island and Greenwich, Robert, Snow and Smith Islands. Scale 1:120000 topographic map.  Troyan: Manfred Wörner Foundation, 2009.

Notes

References
 Chaos Reef. SCAR Composite Antarctic Gazetteer

External links 
 Chaos Reef. Adjusted Copernix satellite image

Landforms of Greenwich Island
Reefs of Antarctica
Landforms of the South Shetland Islands